Luuk Brouwers (born 3 May 1998) is a Dutch professional footballer who plays as a midfielder for Eredivisie club Utrecht.

Club career
Brouwers made his professional debut in the Eerste Divisie for FC Den Bosch on 10 April 2015 in a game against Jong PSV.

On 5 February 2020, Brouwers signed a three-year contract effective from 30 June 2020 with Go Ahead Eagles.

On 23 March 2022, Brouwers agreed to join Utrecht on a five-year contract, beginning in July 2022.

Honours
Individual
Eredivisie Player of the Month: October 2021
Eredivisie Team of the Month: October 2021

References

External links
 Career stats & profile - Voetbal International
 

1998 births
Living people
Sportspeople from Helmond
Dutch footballers
Footballers from North Brabant
Association football midfielders
Eredivisie players
Eerste Divisie players
FC Den Bosch players
Go Ahead Eagles players
FC Utrecht players